Blafe (Mblafe), also known as Tonda or Indorodoro/Yendorador, is a Papuan language of New Guinea. Dialects are Mblafe and Ránmo. It is centered in Indorodoro village of Kandarisa ward, Morehead Rural LLG, Western Province, Papua New Guinea. Mblafe-speaking villages are located along eastern banks of the Bensbach River and inland areas to the east of the river.

References

Tonda languages
Languages of Western Province (Papua New Guinea)